The McLaren M2B was the McLaren team's first Formula One racing car, used during the 1966 season. It was conceived in 1965 and preceded by the M2A development car. Designed by Robin Herd, the innovative but problematic Mallite material was used in its construction. The car was powered by Ford and Serenissima engines but both lacked power and suffered from reliability issues.

Driven by team founder Bruce McLaren, the M2B had a short Grand Prix career, entering six races and starting only four.

Background and development
Bruce McLaren Motor Racing was founded in 1963; Bruce McLaren was a factory driver for the Cooper motor racing team which competed in Formula One, the highest level of international single-seater competition. For two years the McLaren team had raced in the Tasman Series, a competition for single-seaters that ran during the Formula One world championship off-season, and in various sports car races. Bruce McLaren continued to race in Grands Prix (i.e. Formula One championship races) for Cooper, but by 1965 the team's performances were worsening and so he decided to build his own Formula One car to race the following year. Despite being a skilled engineer himself, McLaren enlisted Robin Herd to design the car. Herd was an aerospace engineer who had previously worked at the National Gas Turbine Establishment (NGTE) where he had been involved with the Concorde project. In September 1965 the M2A development car was completed. Powered by a 4.5 litre Oldsmobile V8 engine, it was used to test Herd's design ideas and Firestone's tyres. With McLaren still employed by Cooper, the McLaren team initially denied that they were building a Formula One competitor, claiming that the M2A was purely a tyre test bed.

At the factory in Colnbrook, construction started on at least two M2B chassis, whilst a third was possibly started but not completed. Also that month, the design team was joined by Herd's former NGTE colleague Gordon Coppuck; Coppuck later became chief designer at McLaren. In February 1966 further testing was carried out in California, United States in anticipation of the start of the world championship season in May.

Design
The M2B was a mid-engined rear-wheel drive monocoque design, monocoques having been popularised by Lotus's 25 of 1962. Influenced by his aerospace experience, Herd built the chassis with Mallite, a material that had originally been designed for internal panelling in aircraft. Mallite is a composite of balsa wood bonded between two sheets of aluminium alloy that is much stiffer than ordinary aluminium alloy, a useful characteristic for a racing car. However, the material proved to be difficult to bend into the curved shapes needed and so, whilst the M2A prototype was made entirely of Mallite except for the steel bulkheads, on the M2B it was utilised only for the inner and upper skins, the remainder being aluminium alloy. Mallite was also complicated to repair after crash damage. Glass-reinforced plastic bodywork covered the nose, cockpit and engine. Fuel was stored in rubber bag tanks situated within the moncoque.

Herd's knowledge of aerodynamics and Bruce McLaren's experience with Ford's sports car racing programme combined to spur the team into experimenting with aerodynamic bodywork. The M2A was fitted with a rear wing that produced downforce – downwards pressure on the car and tyres which allows faster cornering – and reduced lap times by three seconds at a test at Zandvoort circuit in November 1965, two and a half years before the Brabham and Ferrari teams eventually debuted wings in a Grand Prix. The team intended to use the wing on the M2B, but the engine problems that occurred prevented this.

The suspension was a conventional wishbone-based arrangement with inboard coilover springs and dampers at the front and outboard coilover springs and dampers at the rear. Braking was provided by Girling discs within  diameter magnesium alloy wheels.

For 1966 the Formula One engine capacity limit was increased to 3.0 litres from the 1.5 litres of the previous five seasons. McLaren considered and discounted British Racing Motors (BRM), Maserati, Coventry Climax and Oldsmobile engines before opting for a Ford V8 engine. This engine was originally designed for the Indianapolis 500, the premier single-seater oval track race in the United States, and had to be reduced in capacity from 4.2 litres to the 3.0 litre limit. This choice was partly motivated by the belief that it might bring financial support from Ford, although this never materialised. Ex BMW and Daimler-Benz engineer Klaus von Rucker was initially appointed to carry out the conversion of the engine in England. However, progress was slow so the project was transferred to Traco Engineering in California, United States, where extensive modifications were made to the internals under the oversight of McLaren's Gary Knutson. In its 4.2 litre form the Ford engine produced 470 bhp and McLaren expected the reduced capacity version to produce about 335 bhp. In fact, it produced 300 bhp in a narrow power band and was further handicapped by its large size and weight; combined with the gearbox it weighed nearly as much as rival team Brabham's entire car. In order to allow time to further develop the Ford, McLaren also used a Serenissima M166 3.0 litre V8 engine for some of the races. This engine produced about 260 bhp and required modifications to be made to the monocoque but was at least relatively light and compact. Four- and five-speed ZF transaxle gearboxes and a Borg & Beck clutch were employed.

The M2B was originally intended to be raced in a green and silver colour scheme designed by Michael Turner. However, short on money, the McLaren team made a financial deal with the makers of the film Grand Prix – a drama that included actual race footage – which involved the car being painted white with a green stripe (edged in silver) in order to represent the film's fictional Japanese "Yamura" team.

Racing history

The Ford-powered M2B made its debut driven by McLaren at the world championship season-opening . There he qualified 10th on the grid and ran as high as sixth but retired after nine laps due to an oil leak. After Monaco McLaren decided "it looks as though we're going to have to make some fairly drastic moves in the engine room", and so for the next race in Belgium the Serenissima engine was used. The replacement unit did not provide an immediate solution though, terminally damaging its bearings in practice. With no spare, McLaren was unable to start the race. At final event in Mexico, the rear bodywork was cut away to help prevent overheating but the engine failed during the race. McLaren had intended for Chris Amon, who was already racing sports cars for the team, to race a second car but the engine problems prevented this.

World Championship results table

Legacy
Despite the M2B's lack of success Herd said of the team, "Everyone was ten times more determined to do better the following year." On the design of the car he reflected that, "our emphasis tended to be more on the elegance of the chassis structure rather than on the design of a really quick racing car" and that, "we ... tended to go towards technical ingenuity and bullshit rather than racewinning engineering". Team member and later manager of the organisation Teddy Mayer said, "Our main problems were with the choice of the Ford engine." Bruce McLaren's personal secretary and author Eoin Young concurs. The winners of the 1966 Drivers' and Constructors' championships, Jack Brabham and his eponymous team, used a Repco-modified and badged Oldsmobile engine. It produced approximately 290 bhp – less than the Ford – but its light weight and reliability rendered it effective. Despite having used the Oldsmobile in sports racing cars, the McLaren team discounted it. Afterwards, Mayer said, "We considered it, but the kind of modifications which Repco did were well beyond our resources, and I doubt very much if we could have done any more with it than we did with the Indy Ford."

McLaren's later cars abandoned Mallite in favour of conventional aluminium construction; the Ford and Serenissima engine also saw no further action. For 1967 BRM engines powered the M4B and M5A but it was not until the Cosworth DFV became available in 1968 that McLaren scored their first Formula One wins with the M7A. Herd stayed on designing all of these cars until he left for Cosworth in 1967. McLaren have since become one of the most successful teams in Formula One.

The M2A was sold on to be used by various private racers in the United Kingdom before being destroyed by fire in 1969. Sources suggest that three M2B chassis were similarly sold on; one is awaiting restoration in the United States and another is currently on display at the Donington Grand Prix Exhibition.

References

Notes

Citations

Bibliography

External links

McLaren M02B
1966 Formula One season cars